Neera is an Indian feminine given name meaning "water".

It may refer to the following notable people:

Neera Arya (5 March 1902 - 26 July 1998), a veteran of the Indian National Army.
Neera Desai (1925–2009), Indian researcher, activist, social worker and academic
Neera Tanden (born 1970), American political consultant and government official
Neera Yadav (politician) (born 1971), Indian politician
Anna Radius Zuccari (1846–1918), Italian writer who used the pen name Neera

Indian feminine given names